Gary D. Robson (May 11, 1958) is an American author from Red Lodge, Montana. He is best known for his children's picture book series entitled Who Pooped in the Park?, which teaches children about animal scat and tracks. The series currently comprises 20 books, mostly set in United States National Parks. The 20th book in the series was released in 2016, covering Central Park in New York City.

Robson is also an expert in closed captioning and subtitling technologies for deaf and hard of hearing people.

Biography

Robson was born in Poughkeepsie, New York in 1958 and grew up in Colorado, where he graduated from Boulder High School in 1976. He began writing for technical journals in 1984, and wrote a series of computer manuals before writing his first book in 1996 with Richard Sherman (a.k.a. Mr. Modem). He continued to write while working in the electronics industry until 2001, when he and his wife moved to Montana and purchased a bookstore. He was the publisher and editor-in-chief of the monthly alternative newspaper in Red Lodge, The Local Rag.

Closed captioning

Cheetah International, the company founded by Robson and his wife, began producing software and equipment for closed captioning in 1997, and Robson published articles on the subject for a variety of publications, including the Journal of Court Reporting, Newswaves, and Nuts & Volts. He holds three patents related to closed captioning: U.S. Patent #7,360,234 (2008), U.S. Patent #8,245,252 B2 (2012), and U.S. Patent #8,312,485 (2008). He was presented with the Andrew Saks Engineering Award for "outstanding contributions in improving visual accessibility to information via realtime captioning for deaf and hard-of-hearing Americans" by Telecommunications for the Deaf, Inc. in 1997.

He wrote three books about closed captioning, most notably The Closed Captioning Handbook, published  by Focal Press, then an imprint of Elsevier.

He presented a TED Talk at TEDxBozeman in 2014 entitled, "Does closed captioning still serve deaf people?"

Works

Children's picture books 
The Who Pooped in the Park? series is published by Farcountry Press in Helena, Montana. Each book in the series focuses on the indigenous wildlife of a particular National Park or ecosystem in the United States. Robson has used two different illustrators. Elijah Brady Clark illustrated the first six books, and Robert Rath has illustrated the rest.

 Who Pooped in Central Park?                  –  (2016)
 Who Pooped in the Redwoods?               –  (2015)
 Who Pooped in the Cascades?                              –  (2013)
 Who Pooped in the North Woods?            –  (2008)
 Who Pooped on the Colorado Plateau?                                        –  (2008)
 Who Pooped in the Black Hills?                                             –  (2007)
 Who Pooped in the Park? (Death Valley National Park)                       –  (2007)
 Who Pooped in the Park? (Big Bend National Park)                           –  (2006)
 Who Pooped in the Park? (Acadia National Park)                             –  (2006)
 Who Pooped in the Park? (Olympic National Park)                            –  (2006)
 Who Pooped in the Sonoran Desert?                                          –  (2006)
 Who Pooped in the Park? (Shenandoah National Park)                         –  (2006)
 Who Pooped in the Park? (Sequoia/Kings Canyon National Parks) –  (2006)
 Who Pooped in the Park? (Rocky Mountain National Park)                     –  (2005)
 Who Pooped in the Park? (Grand Canyon National Park)                       –  (2005)
 Who Pooped in the Park? (Red Rock Canyon National Conservation Area)       –  (2005)
 Who Pooped in the Park? (Yosemite National Park)                           –  (2005)
 Who Pooped in the Park? (Grand Teton National Park)                        –  (2004)
 Who Pooped in the Park? (Glacier National Park) –  (2004)
 Who Pooped in the Park? (Yellowstone National Park)                        –  (2004)

Tea Books 
 Myths & Legends of Tea, Volume 1                   –  (2015) – Proseyr Publishing
 A Tea Journey: Your Personal Tea Cupping Journal   –  (2015) – Proseyr Publishing

Closed captioning and related technologies 
 The Closed Captioning Handbook           –  (2004) – Focal Press
 Alternative Realtime Careers             –  (2000) – NCRA Press
 Inside Captioning                        –  (1997) – NCRA Press

Other nonfiction 
 Gary's Guide to Successful Book Signings –  (2016) – Proseyr Publishing
 The Very Best of the Red Lodge Local Rag –  (2015) – Proseyr Publishing
 The Darkest Hour: A Comprehensive Account of the Smith Mine Disaster of 1943, 3rd edition –  (2015) – Proseyr Publishing (with Fay Kuhlman)               
 The Court Reporter's Guide to Cyberspace –  (1996) – Cyberdawg Publishing (with Richard A. Sherman)

Awards and recognition 
1997 Andrew Saks Engineering Award 
2014 Moonbeam Children's Book Awards Silver medal in Non-Fiction – Animals, Who Pooped in the Cascades?
2014 High Plains Book Award Finalist, Who Pooped in the Cascades?

References

External links 

 Author page on GoodReads
 WorldCat page

1958 births
Living people
American children's writers
Writers from Montana
American male writers
People from Red Lodge, Montana
Keepers of animal sanctuaries